Gai Zengchen (born 6 April 1955) is a Chinese football coach and a former international who played for Liaoning FC as well as China in the 1980 Asian Cup.

Playing career 
Gai Zengchen was born in Dalian where he showed great tactical awareness, and was soon snapped up by Liaoning FC. He joined their senior team in the 1974 Chinese league season. His abilities soon saw him called up to the Chinese U-20 team where he played in the 1975 AFC Youth Championship and helped guide China to a quarter-finals finish. Back with Liaoning he became a regular within their team as they went on to win the 1978 Chinese league title. During this period Gai received a call-up to the senior national team and was included in the squad that went to the 1980 Asian Cup. 

After spending several more years with Liaoning he decided to retire in 1984 where he went back to his studies finishing University. Gai returned to football in 1986 when he went back to Liaoning as a coach, which eventually saw become their youth coach from 1989 to 1993. This was followed by a stint at a Chinese high school from 1993 to 1997 as well as short period with the Chinese U-20 team. 

In 1998, he returned to Liaoning before having a stint with Changchun Yatai in 1999, Dalian Shide F.C. in 2000. From 2002 to 2004 he sided with Shenyang Jinde.

Personal life
Gai Zengchen has three older brothers Gai Zengsheng, Gai Zengxian, Gai Zengjun. All four brothers used to be professional football players, and are considered one of the most famous brothers in Chinese football history.

Career statistics

International statistics

Honours

Player
Liaoning FC
Chinese Jia-A League: 1978

References

External links
Team China Stats

1955 births
Living people
Chinese footballers
Footballers from Dalian
China international footballers
1980 AFC Asian Cup players
Liaoning F.C. players
Chinese football managers
Association football forwards